Varlamov is a Russian or Ukrainian masculine surname, derived from the saint's name Barlaam. Its feminine counterpart is Varlamova. It may refer to:

People
 Aleksandr Varlamov (b. 1979), diver who has represented both Russia and Belarus during his career.
 Alexander Egorovich Varlamov (1801–1848), Russian composer
 Alexander Vladimirovich Varlamov (1904–1990), Russian composer
 Andrey Varlamov (b. 1954), Italian theoretical physicist
 Evgeny Varlamov (b. 1976), Russian ice hockey defender
 Galina Varlamova (b. 1951), Russian writer, philologist and folklorist
 Igor Varlamov (b. 1971), retired Russian footballer
 Ivan Varlamov (1937–2020), retired Soviet footballer
 Konstantin Varlamov (1848–1915), Russian stage actor
 Nina Varlamova (1954–2008), Russian politician
 Semyon Varlamov (b. 1988), Russian ice hockey goaltender
 Sergei Varlamov (b. 1978), Ukrainian former NHL hockey player
 Valentin Varlamov (1934–1980) Cosmonaut candidate/instructor
 Viktor Varlamov (b. 1948), former Soviet speedskater
 Yevgeni Varlamov (b. 1975), retired Russian footballer, currently coaching at CSKA Moscow

Places
Varlamov is also the name of several rural localities in Russia

See also
 Varlam, the first name which Varlamov is derived from. Also used as a surname.
 Varlaam (disambiguation), alternative form of the first name

Russian-language surnames